Boyd Nunatak is a small nunatak  southeast of Mount Caroline Mikkelsen, on the south side of Publications Ice Shelf. It was first mapped by Norwegian cartographers from air photos taken by the Lars Christensen Expedition, 1936–37, remapped by the Australian National Antarctic Research Expeditions, and named by the Antarctic Names Committee of Australia for J.S. Boyd, a physicist at Wilkes Station in 1965.

References 

Nunataks of Princess Elizabeth Land
Ingrid Christensen Coast